Vincelottes is a commune in the Yonne department in Bourgogne-Franche-Comté in north-central France. The bibliographer Jean-Félicissime Adry was born here in 1749.

See also
Communes of the Yonne department

References

Communes of Yonne